Keuphylia is a monotypic genus of crustaceans belonging to the monotypic family Keuphyliidae. The only species is Keuphylia nodosa.

The species is found in Coral Sea.

References

Isopoda
Monotypic crustacean genera